Tommi Leinonen (born May 14, 1987) is a Finnish professional ice hockey player who currently plays for EHC Lustenau of the second-tier Austrian National League.

Awards
2005–06: Jr. A SM-liiga Silver Medal
2005–06: SM-liiga Bronze Medal
2005–06: U20 WJC Bronze Medal
2006–07: Kanada-Malja winner, Kärpät

Career statistics

Regular season and playoffs

International

External links
 

Finnish ice hockey defencemen
HPK players
Oulun Kärpät players
Pittsburgh Penguins draft picks
Living people
1987 births
People from Kajaani
Sportspeople from Kainuu